Faimalaga Luka OBE (April 15, 1940 – August 19, 2005) was a political figure from the Pacific nation of Tuvalu. He represented the constituency of Nukufetau in the Parliament of Tuvalu. He served as Governor-General and the Prime Minister of Tuvalu.

Background

He was a broadcaster and politician, spending 40 years in the civil service and in politics, serving in roles including Minister for Health from 1994 to 1996 and Minister of Home Affairs from 1999 to 2001. He was married to Sikiona Luka.

In the New Years Honours of 1995, he was awarded an OBE for public service.

Prime Minister

After the death of Prime Minister Ionatana on 8 December 2000, Lagitupu Tuilimu was acting prime minister from 8 December 2000 to 24 February 2001. Faimalaga Luka became the Prime Minister of Tuvalu on 23 February 2001 and was sworn in the next day with a reshuffled cabinet. Luka's government lasted until December 2001, when he lost office as the consequence of a motion of no confidence. On 13 December 2001 the former finance minister Koloa Talake was appointed prime minister.

Speaker of Parliament

In June 2003 he became speaker of parliament, although an opposition MP at the time.

Governor-General

Luka was appointed as Governor-General on 9 September 2003, as the representative of Elizabeth II, Queen of Tuvalu. He retired on 15 April 2005, after reaching his 65th birthday. Tuvalu, unlike most countries, has a mandatory retirement age for all civil servants.

Declines a knighthood

Historical note: Luka was the only Governor-General of Tuvalu not to accept a knighthood. The practice of a Governor-General of Tuvalu accepting a knighthood was resumed by Luka's successor to that office, Sir Filoimea Telito, who accepted an appointment to the Most Distinguished Order of Saint Michael and Saint George (GCMG).

Death

He died on August 19, 2005 in Fiji where he had been referred for medical treatment.

See also
Politics of Tuvalu

References

 

1940 births
2005 deaths
Officers of the Order of the British Empire
Prime Ministers of Tuvalu
Health ministers of Tuvalu
Interior ministers of Tuvalu
Governors-General of Tuvalu
Speakers of the Parliament of Tuvalu